This is a list of episodes for the American animated television series Home Movies. The series began with "Get Away From My Mom", which was broadcast on April 26, 1999, by UPN, which showed the first five episodes premiered before it was cancelled. The series was revived by Adult Swim, which showed the remaining episodes from season one, and ordered three additional seasons. The series officially ended with "Focus Grill" on April 4, 2004, with a total of 52 episodes over the course of four seasons. The entire series is available on DVD.

Series overview

Episodes

Season 1 (1999–2001)

Season 2 (2002)

Season 3 (2002–03)

Season 4 (2003–04)

See also 
 Home Movies
 List of Home Movies characters

External links

References 

Home Movies
Home Movies